The Austin-Healey 3000 is a British sports car built from 1959 until 1967. It is the best known of the "big Healey" models. The car's bodywork was made by Jensen Motors and the vehicles were assembled at BMC's MG Works in Abingdon, alongside the corporation's MG models.

During its production life, the car changed from an open sports car, albeit with a child-transporting 2+2 option, to a sports convertible. In 1963, 91.5 per cent of all Austin-Healey 3000 cars were exported; mostly to North America. The 3-litre 3000 was a highly successful car, which won its class in many European rallies in its heyday and is still raced in classic car competitions by enthusiasts today.

British Motor Corporation ended manufacture in 1967, intending its place to be filled by a car with a new, though similar, engine in a more recently designed monocoque MGB variant named MGC.

History

BN7, BT7 roadsters

Mark I

The Austin-Healey 3000 was announced on 1 July 1959 with a 3-litre BMC C-Series engine to replace the smaller 2.6-litre engine of the 100-6 and disc brakes for its front wheels. The manufacturers claimed it would reach 60 mph in 11 seconds and 100 mph in 31 seconds.

Other changes were minor compared to those between the original 100 and the 100–6. The wheelbase and body were unchanged as were the body-styles, a 2+2 or BT7 and a two-seater BN7.

Weather protection remained minimal, a folding plastic roof on a light demountable frame and above the doors detachable side screens holding sliding perspex panels. Wire wheels, overdrive gearbox, laminated windscreen, heater,  adjustable steering column, detachable hard top for the 2+2, and two-tone paint were available as options.

13,650 Mark Is were built: 2,825 BN7 open two-seaters, and 10,825 BT7 2+2s

Road test

BN7, BT7 roadsters

Mark II

Engines fitted with three SU HS4 carburettors (total area 5.3 sq. inches) and an improved camshaft were announced at the end of May 1961. Other changes included a vertical barred front grille. Optional extras were similar to the Mark I. From August 1961 a brake servo was also available as an optional extra, which greatly improved braking performance.

Road test
The test car cost £1362 including taxes.

Last true roadsters
The BN7 Mark II was discontinued in March 1962, and the BT7 Mark II in June 1962

BJ7 sports convertible

Mark II

The 3000 sports convertible Mark II was launched at the end of August 1962. It was a true convertible with almost saloon car comfort, a new wrap-around windscreen, wind-up side windows, swiveling quarter lights and a quick-action folding roof. Twin SU HS6 carburettors replaced the triple SUs (total area 5.3 sq. inches, a 9.25% reduction). Austin-Healey claimed it could exceed 115 mph.

91.5 per cent of all 1963 Austin Healey 3000 cars were exported mostly to North America.

11,564 Mark IIs were made: 355 BN7 open two-seaters, 5,096 BT7 2+2s, and 6,113 BJ7 2+2 sports convertibles

BJ8 sports convertible

Mark III

The 3000 sports convertible Mark III was announced in February 1964 with power increased from 136 bhp to 150 bhp by a new higher lift camshaft. SU HD8 carburettors replaced HS6 units increasing the choke size from 1.75 to 2 inches, or total area 6.3 sq. inches, increasing by 30.6%. Power-assisted braking became standard instead of optional. The new car's fascia displayed its speedometer and tachometer directly in front of the driver. Upholstery was now in Ambla vinyl

The Mark III BJ8 remained in production until the end of 1967 when manufacture of the Austin-Healey 3000 ceased.

In May 1964 the Phase II version of the Mark III was released, which gained ground clearance through a modified rear chassis. In March 1965 the car received separate indicator lights.

17,712 Mark IIIs were manufactured.

Sidescreens

Pininfarina grand tourer
Pininfarina exhibited the 3000 as a closed roof grand tourer at the October 1962 Earls Court Show. It was the winning design from a competition by Swiss motoring publication Auto-Jahr.

In racing
Austin Healey 3000's have a long competition history, and raced at most major racing circuits around the world, including Sebring (USA), Le Mans (France), and Mount Panorama Circuit, Bathurst (Australia). The BMC competitions department rallied the 3000 from its introduction, but the development of the works cars effectively ended in 1965, mainly because of the success of the Mini Cooper 'S'.

References

Further reading

External links

 Austin Memories—History of Austin and Longbridge
 Volunteer register with records and photos of the 3000
 
 Austin Healey 3000 Mark I-Mark III— specifications and technical data in automobile-catalog.com
 Wants To Rule The World Tears For Fears music video— Featuring the Austin-Healey 3000

3000
Roadsters
Rally cars
Rear-wheel-drive vehicles
1960s cars
Cars introduced in 1959
Cars discontinued in 1967